The Vampire Lovers is a 1970 British Gothic horror film directed by Roy Ward Baker and starring Ingrid Pitt, Peter Cushing, George Cole, Kate O'Mara, Madeline Smith, Dawn Addams and Jon Finch. It was produced by Hammer Film Productions. It is based on the 1872 Sheridan Le Fanu novella Carmilla and is the first film in the Karnstein Trilogy, the other two films being Lust for a Vampire (1971) and Twins of Evil (1971). The three films were somewhat daring for the time in explicitly depicting lesbian themes.

Plot
In Styria, 1794, a beautiful blonde woman in a diaphanous gown materializes from a misty graveyard and kills a man she lures out of a tavern. While going back to her grave, she finds her shroud missing. She is thus forced to face Baron Hartog, a vampire hunter who was stalking her in order to avenge the death of his sister. The woman is identified as a vampire and decapitated.

Decades later, Austrian General Spielsdorf is throwing a ball in his estate to celebrate the birthday of his niece, Laura. A countess, who's recently moved into the general's neighbouring property, is in attendance with her beautiful daughter Marcilla. After talking with a mysterious man in black, the countess tells the general she has to go visit a sick relative, and asks him to care for Marcilla in her absence. Laura quickly befriends her, despite her strange demeanour, while Marcilla seems to be sexually attracted to her new friend. Laura subsequently experiences violent nightmares where she's attacked by a giant cat, then suddenly dies of a gradual, inexplicable anemia. On her breasts, two tiny puncture wounds are discovered. After that, Marcilla disappears and General Spielsdorf leaves to find Baron Hartog.

Marcilla, now going by the alias "Carmilla", is reunited with the countess. They stage a carriage breakdown near the residence of Mr. Morton, a wealthy Englishman living in Styria and a friend of the general's. Once again, the countess manipulates Mr. Morton into offering hospitality to her alleged relative (this time introduced as her niece). At the Mortons' place, Carmilla attempts to seduce Morton's naïve daughter Emma, who resists her more romantic overtures. Thereafter, Emma also falls ill and starts suffering from nightmares of the giant cat, while her breasts show the same wounds as Laura. After Emma's father has to go to Vienna on a business trip, Emma's governess, Mademoiselle Perrodot, is seduced by Carmilla and becomes her accomplice after sleeping with her. Meanwhile, Carmilla has started feeding on people from the nearby village, causing a number of mysterious deaths where the corpses are drained of all blood.

Morton's butler, Renton, learns about local vampire superstitions and enlists the help of the doctor who had already treated Laura. They use garlic flowers and crucifixes to ward Emma, who is now dying. Carmilla attacks and kills the doctor on the road. She then seduces and subjugates Renton, who was under the wrong impression the only real vampire was Mademoiselle Perrodot, who has shown an aversion to garlic. With Renton under her control, Carmilla is able to have the wards removed. Knowing she has been found out she quickly dispatches Renton, with the intention of retreating into her grave and taking Emma with her as her lover.

Morton, who was called home by Renton, meets General Spielsdorf and Baron Hartog, who were on their way to the ruins of Karnstein Castle, along with Laura's fiancé Carl. Hartog reveals the Karnsteins were a family of vampires from the 16th century. In his youth, he had managed to destroy nearly all of them, starting with the blonde woman who had killed his sister. However, he couldn't find the grave of the young Mircalla Karnstein. Looking at her portrait in the castle hall, Spielsdorf and Morton realize she is the same girl they separately know as Marcilla and Carmilla. Carl makes haste and rides back to Morton's to rescue Emma.

As Mircalla prepares to leave with Emma, Mademoiselle Perrodot begs to be taken with her. Mircalla kills and drains her instead. At that moment, Carl arrives and chases Mircalla away using a poignard as a cross. Mircalla dematerializes and flees to Karnstein Castle, where the Baron and the others are waiting for her return. Once located in her resting coffin, General Spielsdorf drives a stake into Carmilla's heart and cuts off her head, thus avenging his daughter's death. Emma is freed of the vampire's sickness and influence. In the final scene, the image of Mircalla in her portrait on the wall turns into a fanged skeleton.

Throughout the film, a mysterious man in black watches all these events unfold from a distance, occasionally laughing with contempt.

Cast

 Ingrid Pitt as Marcilla/Carmilla/Mircalla Karnstein
 Pippa Steel as Laura Spielsdorf
 Madeline Smith as Emma Morton
 Peter Cushing as General Spielsdorf
 George Cole as Roger Morton
 Dawn Addams as the Countess
 Kate O'Mara as the governess, Mademoiselle Perrodot
 Douglas Wilmer as Baron Joachim von Hartog
 Jon Finch as Carl Ebhardt
 Ferdy Mayne as the doctor
 Kirsten Lindholm as the First Vampire (the blonde woman)
 John Forbes-Robertson as the Man in Black
 Shelagh Wilcocks as the housekeeper
 Harvey Hall as Renton, the butler
 Janet Key as Gretchin, the maid
 Charles Farrell as the landlord

Production 
The film was a co-production between Hammer and American International, who were interested in a vampire movie with more explicit sexual content to take advantage of a more relaxed censorship environment. It was decided to adapt Carmilla. Harry Fine and Michael Style were the two producers.

Before production, the script of The Vampire Lovers was sent to the chief censor John Trevelyan, who warned the studio about depictions of lesbianism, pointing out that a previous lesbian film, The Killing of Sister George, had had five minutes excised by his office. In response, Hammer replied that the lesbianism was not of their doing, but was present in the original story by Le Fanu. Trevelyan backed down as a result.

Production of The Vampire Lovers began at Elstree Studios on 19 January 1970 and used locations in the grounds of Moor Park Mansion, Hertfordshire (standing in for Styria, Central Europe). Produced on a relatively low budget of £165,227, it was the final Hammer film to be financed with American money—most of the later films were backed by Rank or EMI.

While filming the scene in which Carmilla attacks Madame Perrodot, Ingrid Pitt's fangs kept falling out of her mouth and dropping into Kate O'Mara's cleavage, prompting gales of uncontrollable laughter from both actresses. Finally, Pitt grabbed some chewing gum from the mouth of one of the crew members and used it to secure her fangs.

Critical reception 

The Vampire Lovers has received mixed reception from critics. Variety's review of the film was mixed, claiming the story was not great and it had "fairly flat dialog," but the script had "all the needed ingredients." A. H. Weiler of The New York Times called it "a departure from the hackneyed bloody norm... professionally directed, opulently staged and sexy to boot." The Monthly Film Bulletin declared, "Rather below par, even by recent Hammer standards, this involves the customary heavy breathing, lusty fangs and tolerably luxurious sets, with the innovation of an exposed nipple or two to support the lesbian angle."

Dave Kehr wrote a favourable retrospective review for Chicago Reader, writing that the film "resulted from the last significant surge of creative energy at Britain's Hammer Films, which thereafter descended into abject self-parody." Film critic Leonard Maltin gave the film a passing grade of two-and-a-half stars, calling it a "rather erotic Hammer chiller".

Allmovie wrote, "This Hammer Films production isn't their finest moment but its easy to understand why it has become an enduring cult favorite with horror fans: The Vampire Lovers pushes the "bloodshed & bosoms" formula of the Hammer hits to its limit". On review-aggregator website Rotten Tomatoes the film has an approval rating of 76%, based on 20 reviews, and is certified "fresh".

Home video
The Vampire Lovers was released on 26 August 2003 on DVD by MGM Home Video (Fox Video) as a double-sided Midnite Movies Double Feature DVD consisting of both The Vampire Lovers and Countess Dracula (1971). Scream Factory released the film on Blu-ray on 30 April 2013 and a "Collector's Edition" was released with a new 4K scan of the original camera negative on 21 December 2021.

See also
Vampire films

References

Further reading

External links
 
 
 

1970 films
1970 horror films
1970s historical horror films
1970 LGBT-related films
British LGBT-related films
Films shot at Associated British Studios
British erotic films
British historical horror films
Films based on works by Sheridan Le Fanu
Films directed by Roy Ward Baker
Films set in Austria
Hammer Film Productions horror films
British vampire films
Gothic horror films
LGBT-related horror films
Films shot in Hertfordshire
Films set in country houses
Films set in 1794
Lesbian-related films
Films based on horror novels
Films based on Irish novels
British supernatural horror films
British exploitation films
1970s English-language films
1970s British films